George Granville Sutherland-Leveson-Gower, 5th Duke of Sutherland, KT, PC (29 August 1888 – 1 February 1963), styled Earl Gower until 1892 and Marquess of Stafford between 1892 and 1913, was a British courtier, patron of the film industry and Conservative party politician from the Leveson-Gower family. He held minor office in the Conservative administration of Bonar Law and Stanley Baldwin in the 1920s and was later Lord Steward of the Household from 1935 to 1936. As a noted patron of the British film industry, the Sutherland Trophy, awarded by the British Film Institute, is named in his honour.

Background
Sutherland was the eldest son of Cromartie Sutherland-Leveson-Gower, 4th Duke of Sutherland, by Lady Millicent St Clair-Erskine, daughter of Robert St Clair-Erskine, 4th Earl of Rosslyn. He was born at Cliveden House, Buckinghamshire, in 1888 and was educated at Summer Fields School, Oxford, and Eton College.

Military and naval service
Sutherland served in the regular army as a lieutenant in the Royal Scots Greys from 1909 to 1910, and later in the Territorial Force as a captain in the 5th battalion of the Seaforth Highlanders from 1910 to 1912. From 1914, he was Honorary Colonel of the same battalion.

He later took a commission in the Royal Naval Reserve, with which he served in the First World War, rising to the rank of commander. In 1914, he commanded  and served on the British Military Mission to Belgium from 1914–1915. From 1915 to 1917, he commanded the Motor Flotilla sailing between Egypt and the Adriatic Sea. He was awarded the Order of the Crown of Italy.

Political career
Sutherland succeeded his father in the dukedom in 1913 and took his seat in the House of Lords. The same year he was appointed Lord-Lieutenant of Sutherland (succeeding his father), a position he retained until 1944. He was Lord High Commissioner to the General Assembly of the Church of Scotland in 1921 and then served in the Conservative governments of Bonar Law and Stanley Baldwin as Under-Secretary of State for Air from 1922 to 1924, as Paymaster-General from 1925 to 1928, and as Under-Secretary of State for War from 1928 to 1929. He was appointed a Knight of the Thistle in 1929. In 1936, he was sworn of the Privy Council and appointed Lord Steward of the Household, a post he held until 1937.  In the latter year he bore the orb at the coronation of King George VI.

Sutherland was the first Chairman of the British Film Institute, from 1933 to 1936, and remained its patron until his death. From 1958, the BFI awarded the Sutherland Trophy, named after him, to "the maker of the most original and imaginative film introduced at the National Film Theatre during the year".

Family
Sutherland married Lady Eileen Gwladys Butler, daughter of Charles Butler, 7th Earl of Lanesborough on 11 April 1912. After her death in 1943, he married Clare Josephine O'Brian (1903–1998) on 1 July 1944. Sutherland died in 1963, aged 74 and without issue. His titles were divided according to their patents: the Earldom of Sutherland and Lordship of Strathnaver passed to his niece, Elizabeth Sutherland, 24th Countess of Sutherland, only daughter of Lord Alastair Sutherland-Leveson-Gower, while the remainder of his titles passed to the heir male, a distant relative, the Earl of Ellesmere.

References

1888 births
1963 deaths
People educated at Eton College
Dukes of Sutherland
George
Knights of the Thistle
Lord-Lieutenants of Sutherland
Members of the Privy Council of the United Kingdom
George Sutherland-Leveson-Gower, 5th Duke of Sutherland
People educated at Summer Fields School
Lords High Commissioner to the General Assembly of the Church of Scotland
Royal Scots Greys officers
Royal Navy officers of World War I
Residents of Thatched House Lodge
20th-century Scottish businesspeople
Royal Naval Reserve personnel